The Oceanium is a public aquarium that opened in 2001 in Diergaarde Blijdorp, a zoo in Rotterdam, Netherlands.
The Oceanium lies in the expansion area of the zoo, which includes a new entrance and parking area, and was the biggest project to date for the zoo. The area around the Oceanium is home to projects depicting the Americas.

The Oceanium is also home to scientific research into the conservation of coral.

Sunport
On the roof of the Oceanium is the largest solar power plant in the Netherlands within the built-up area. The plant has been given the name 'Sunport'. The 5000 square meter roof area of the Oceanium contains around 3400 black/grey colored solar panels, with a combined capacity of 510 kilowatt peak. The solar power station supplies approximately 325,000 kWh of electricity per year. Blijdorp immediately uses the electricity generated in the Oceanium itself, especially to cool the king penguins' enclosure. The solar power plant has cost nearly 3.9 million euros, including construction, maintenance and an educational program. The power station was officially opened by Ivo Opstelten, then mayor of Rotterdam.

Seawater
All aquaria in the Oceanium contain clean seawater, in total that is more than eight million liters of water. Only 2 to 5% of the total is changed monthly, thanks to the 10 filters that keep the water clean with 22 different modules. This means that all the water in the shark tank (3375 m³) can be completely filtered and pumped around in 160 minutes.

Blijdorp also receives water from a Maersk container ship that loads seawater into its ballast tanks near Newfoundland. In the Port of Rotterdam, the balance of the ship changes because containers are unloaded on the port side, so that the container ship has to discharge water. If the water quality is good, Blijdorp will have the opportunity to collect the water with an inland vessel that will transport it to the Oceanium.

Animals (selection)
 Puffin
 Guillemot
 Eider
 European bass
 Gilt-head bream
 Homarus gammarus
 Nursehound
 Small-spotted catshark
 Starry smooth-hound
 Atlantic sturgeon
 European plaice
 Atlantic herring
 Atlantic mackerel
 Spiny lobster
 Aurelia aurita
 Nurse shark
 Sandbar shark
 Blacktip shark
 Blacknose shark
 Green sea turtle
 Hawksbill sea turtle
 Great barracuda
 Hippocampus kuda
 Cownose ray
 Lookdown
 Elops saurus
 Long-spine porcupinefish
 Osteoglossidae
 Longnose gar
 Cichla ocellaris
 King penguin
 Gentoo penguin
 Galápagos tortoise
 Horn shark
 Leopard shark
 California sea lion
 California sheephead
 Octopus

References

External links

Oceanaria
Buildings and structures in Rotterdam
Tourist attractions in Rotterdam